The Estey Tavern is a historic tavern in Middleton, Massachusetts.  The 2.5-story wood-frame tavern house was built in 1753 by Samuel Bradford, who operated the tavern until 1763, when it was taken over by John Estey.  The building is notable in part because its eastern ell encapsulates elements of a 17th-century building, including a chimney and some beams.  The building has been converted to residential use, housing three living units.

The building was listed on the National Register of Historic Places in 1989.

See also
National Register of Historic Places listings in Essex County, Massachusetts

References

Drinking establishments on the National Register of Historic Places in Massachusetts
Buildings and structures in Essex County, Massachusetts
National Register of Historic Places in Essex County, Massachusetts
Taverns in Massachusetts
Middleton, Massachusetts